"Oh! Hark!" is a song performed and written by Australian singer–songwriter Lisa Mitchell. The song was released in April 2010 as the third and final single from her debut studio album, Wonder (2009). The track peaked at number 71 on the ARIA Chart.

At the ARIA Music Awards of 2010, the song earned Mitchell a nomination for ARIA Award for Best Female Artist, losing to Megan Washington's I Believe You Liar.

Music video
The official music video was released on 9 March 2010.

Track listing
 "Oh! Hark!"  (single Version)  – 3:48
 "Romeo and Juliet" – 4:48
 "Oh! Hark!"  (Ou Est Le Swimming Pool Remix)  – 3:58

Charts

Release history

References

2009 songs
2010 singles
Lisa Mitchell songs
Warner Music Australasia singles
Song recordings produced by Dann Hume